The Queensland Rugby Union, or QRU, is the governing body for the sport of rugby union within the state of Queensland in Australia. It is a member and founding union of Rugby Australia.

The QRU was founded in Brisbane in 1883 as the Northern Rugby Union, after breaking away from the Queensland Football Association before being formally constituted in 1893 when the name was changed to the Queensland Rugby Football Union.

The first 1883 season began with two clubs: Fireflies and Wanderers. Early intercolonials were played at Eagle Farm Racecourse.

Early member clubs
 Fireflies (1883)
 Wanderers (1883)
 Wasps (1884)
 Wallaroo (1885)
 Beenleigh (1887)

See also

Rugby union in Queensland
Queensland Reds

References

External links
 Queensland Rugby Union

 
1883 establishments in Australia
Sports organizations established in 1883